John Watson Milton (born August 19, 1935) is an American politician, writer, and businessman.

Born in Saint Paul, Minnesota, Milton went to St. Paul Academy and Summit School and then received his bachelor's degree from Princeton University and was a management consultant and health planner. He lived in White Bear Lake, Minnesota and served on the Ramsey County, Minnesota Board of Commissioners. From 1973 to 1977, Milton served in the Minnesota State Senate as a Democrat.

In 2012, Milton published a book about Minnesota State Senator Nick Coleman, entitled For The Good of the Order.

Notes

1935 births
Living people
Politicians from Saint Paul, Minnesota
Princeton University alumni
Businesspeople from Saint Paul, Minnesota
Writers from Saint Paul, Minnesota
County commissioners in Minnesota
Democratic Party Minnesota state senators